Urban Myths is a British biographical comedy drama television series first aired on 19 January 2017 on the Sky Arts. Each episode featured an anecdote surrounding popular culture loosely based on a true story, ranging from Muhammad Ali talking a man down from a ledge to Bob Dylan turning up on a stranger's doorstep in London. A second series was announced featuring The Sex Pistols and Salvador Dalí, which began airing on 12 April 2018.

The series was most notable for a controversy surrounding the casting of Joseph Fiennes in the role of Michael Jackson, an episode that was pulled from transmission.

Episodes

Series 1 (2017)

Series 2 (2018)

Series 3 (2019)

Series 4 (2020)

Reception 
Although stories surrounding the pulled episode overshadowed the rest of the series, the aired episodes attracted a positive response. In particular the opening episode, featuring Eddie Marsan as Bob Dylan, was described in approving newspaper reviews as "charming and hilarious", "short, charming and light-hearted" and "different and pleasing".
The series drew over 600,000 viewers and charted in the top three programmes for Sky Arts each week it aired, save for the episode "Cary Grant and Timothy Leary", which came seventh, largely due to broadcasts of the programme Portrait Artist of the Year.

Controversy 
After it was revealed that Joseph Fiennes was to portray Michael Jackson in the series, several members of Jacksons' family objected, including his daughter, Paris Jackson, who wrote on Twitter, "I'm so incredibly offended by it, as i'm sure plenty of people are as well, and it honestly makes me want to vomit." The tweet was later deleted. After widespread criticism following the release of the series trailer, the episode was pulled from broadcast indefinitely.

Accolades

References

External links

2017 British television series debuts
2010s British comedy-drama television series
2020s British comedy-drama television series
Sky UK original programming
English-language television shows
Casting controversies in television
Cultural depictions of Marlon Brando
Cultural depictions of Michael Jackson
Cultural depictions of Bob Dylan
Cultural depictions of Adolf Hitler
Cultural depictions of Muhammad Ali
Cultural depictions of Orson Welles
Cultural depictions of Salvador Dalí
Cultural depictions of the Sex Pistols
Race-related controversies in television
Television controversies in the United Kingdom